Yuri Abramovich Veksler (4 February 1940 — 29 September 1991) was a Soviet and Russian cinematographer. Winner of the USSR State Prize (1985).

Selected filmography
 Boy with Skates (1962)  
 713 Requests Permission to Land (1962)  
 Hello and Goodbye (1972)
 Strange Adults (1974)  
 The Elder Sons (1976)  
 Sherlock Holmes and Dr. Watson (1979)
 The Adventures of Sherlock Holmes and Dr. Watson (1980)
 The Hound of the Baskervilles (1981)
 The Queen of Spades (1982)
 The Treasures of Agra (1983) 
 Boys (1983) 
 Somebody else's wife and a husband under the bed (1984) 
 Charlotte’s Necklace (1984)
 Winter Cherry (1985)
 The Twentieth Century Approaches (1986)

References

External links

 Биография кинооператора

1940 births
1991 deaths
Soviet cinematographers
Russian cinematographers
Recipients of the USSR State Prize

Soviet Jews
Russian Jews